Sissala East is one of the constituencies represented in the Parliament of Ghana. It elects one Member of Parliament (MP) by the first past the post system of election. Sissala East is located in the Sissala East Municipal  of the Upper West Region of Ghana.

This seat was created prior to the Ghanaian parliamentary election in 2004.

Boundaries 
The seat is located within the Sissala East District of the Upper West Region of Ghana. Its northern neighbour is Burkina Faso. To the north west is the Sissala West constituency and the Wa East is to the south west. From north to south along the eastern border lie the Chiana-Paga constituency in the Kassena/Nankana District and the Builsa North and Builsa South constituencies in the Builsa District, all within the Upper East Region.

History 
In 2004, the Sissala West was carved out of this constituency by the Electoral Commission of Ghana. The MPs and results listed here prior to 2004 are for the old Sissala constituency.

Members of Parliament

Elections

See also 
 List of Ghana Parliament constituencies

References 

Parliamentary constituencies in the Upper West Region